Václav Sejk (born 18 May 2002) is a Czech professional footballer who plays as a forward for Jablonec on loan from Sparta Prague.

Club career
Sejk started his career with local sides TJ Spartak Boletice n.L. and FK Junior Děčín before joining Teplice in 2015. After moving to Sparta Prague in 2017, he progressed through the youth ranks and 'B' team, before being loaned back to Teplice in 2022. He started well for Teplice, and was noted for his goalscoring ability.

Career statistics

Club

Notes

References

2002 births
Living people
Czech footballers
Czech Republic youth international footballers
Association football forwards
Bohemian Football League players
Czech National Football League players
Czech First League players
FK Teplice players
AC Sparta Prague players
People from Děčín
Sportspeople from the Ústí nad Labem Region
FK Jablonec players
Czech Republic under-21 international footballers